= Chico Cabaret =

Coordinates: 39°45′25″N 121°50′52″W

The Chico Cabaret is a not-for-profit community theater located in Chico, California. The theater opened on January 19, 2001, with its first show The Emperor's New Clothes. Since then, the theater has specialized in professional-quality comedic plays and musicals. The Chico Cabaret is under the Artistic Direction of Phil Ruttenburg.

Originally opening as a dinner theater, the Chico Cabaret began gaining attention for its provocative choice in performances, such as an annual Halloween performance of the Rocky Horror Show, a seductive Summer series of The Best of Broadway, and the recurring original sketch comedy show The Crippling Thoughts of Victor Bonesteel. The dinner was ultimately removed from the program in order to make room for additional seating.

In 2005, the Chico Cabaret was granted status as a 501(c)(3) Non-Profit Organization. The theater plays host to A Theatre On The Inside-Out, a program developed to provide local teens with the opportunity to write & perform for the purposes of drug prevention, education, and outreach to the community, as well as to Drama Extraordinaire, a performing arts workshop for children with developmental disabilities.
